The Geely Yuanjing S1 is a compact CUV produced by Geely under the Emgrand product line, positioning the Yuanjing S1 just above the Geely Yuanjing X3 subcompact crossover. The Geely Yuanjing S1 is essentially a heavily facelifted Emgrand EC7-RV hatchback.

Overview
 
Originally the launch vehicle for Emgrand, the medium to high-end luxury brand of Geely that was launched in July 2009, the product was repositioned after the facelift. After the discontinuation of the "Emgrand" brand, the Emgrand name became a series of product under the Geely brand, and the Emgrand logo became Geely's new logo. The predecessing Emgrand EC7 hatchback (EC7-RV) went through a heavy facelift and gained plastic caddling to create the crossover-inspired look and was renamed to Yuanjing S1 to be repositioned under the Yuanjing product line while its sedan counterpart, the Geely Emgrand sedan remained to stay as part of the Emgrand product line.

At launch in July 2017, the Geely Vision S1 is available with a 103hp 1.5-litre engine and a 133hp 1.4-litre turbocharged engine.

As of June 2019, the updated Geely Vision S1 (Yuanjing S1) carries a 1.4-litre turbocharged engine satisfying the Chinese National Standard 6 Emissions Standard. The updated Geely Vision S1 features an additional Sports mode, and the entire lineup comes standard with the TPMS and the upgraded GKUI (Geely Smart Ecosystem). Additional features such as power adjustment, electrical heating and LED indictors have been integrated into the outside rear-view mirrors.

References

External links

Yuanjing S1
compact cars
Front-wheel-drive vehicles
Hatchbacks
Cars introduced in 2017
Cars of China